

Z 

 
 
 
 
 
 
 
 
 999 Zachia
 
 
 
 
 
 
 
 
 
 
 
 
 
 
 
 
 
 
 
 
 421 Zähringia
 
 
 
 
 
 
 
 1242 Zambesia
 
 
 1462 Zamenhof
 
 
 
 
 
 
 
 
 
 
 5751 Zao
 
 
 
 
 
 
 
 
 
 
 
 
 
 
 
 
 
 7440 Závist
 
 
 
 
 
 
 
 
 
 
 
 
 
 
 
 
 
 2623 Zech
 1336 Zeelandia
 
 
 
 
 
 
 
 
 851 Zeissia
 
 
 
 
 169 Zelia
 633 Zelima
 654 Zelinda
 
 
 
 
 
 
 
 
 
 
 
 
 
 
 
 
 
 840 Zenobia
 
 
 12923 Zephyr
 693 Zerbinetta
 
 
 531 Zerlina
 
 
 
 5731 Zeus
 438 Zeuxo
 
 
 
 
 
 
 
 
 
 
 
 
 
 
 
 
 
 
 
 
 
 
 
 
 
 
 
 
 
 
 
 
 3789 Zhongguo
 
 
 
 
 1734 Zhongolovich
 
 
 
 
 
 
 2903 Zhuhai
 
 
 
 
 
 
 
 
 
 
 
 
 
 
 3951 Zichichi
 
 
 
 
 
 
 
 
 
 
 
 1775 Zimmerwald
 
 
 
 
 
 
 
 
 
 
 689 Zita
 
 
 
 
 
 
 
 
 
 
 
 
 
 
 
 
 1468 Zomba
 
 
 
 
 
 
 
 1793 Zoya
 
 
 
 
 
 
 
 
 
 865 Zubaida
 
 
 
 
 
 
 
 
 
 1922 Zulu
 
 
 
 
 
 
 13025 Zürich
 
 
 1700 Zvezdara
 
 
 
 
 
 
 785 Zwetana
 1803 Zwicky
 
 
 
 
 2098 Zyskin

See also 
 List of minor planet discoverers
 List of observatory codes

References 
 

Lists of minor planets by name